Cerro de Los Inocentes (meaning "Hill of the Innocents" in Spanish) is the highest mountain in the Juan Fernández Islands, Valparaíso Region, Chile. It is a nesting ground for the Stejneger's petrel.

Geography
The mountain is smooth at the top with a cliff dropping steeply to the waters of the Pacific Ocean off its southwestern face.

See also
List of islands by highest point
List of mountains in Chile

References

External links
Simon G. Haberle, Late Quaternary Vegetation Dynamics and Human Impact on Alexander Selkirk Island, Chile - Journal of Biogeography Vol. 30, No. 2, Special Issue: Biogeography of Southeast Asia (Feb., 2003), pp. 239-255
Isla Alejandro Selkirk travel - Lonely Planet
temporal de viento en la isla Alejandro Selkirk, Chile.AVI
Cerro de Los Inocentes
Alejandro Selkirk Island